Va'eira, Va'era, or Vaera ( — Hebrew for "and I appeared," the first word that God speaks in the parashah, in ) is the fourteenth weekly Torah portion (parashah) in the annual Jewish cycle of Torah reading and the second in the Book of Exodus. It constitutes . The parashah tells of the first seven Plagues of Egypt.

Jews read it the fourteenth Sabbath (Shabbat) after Simchat Torah, generally in January, or rarely, in late December.

It is composed of 6,701 Hebrew letters, 1,748 Hebrew words, 121 verses, and 222 lines in a Torah Scroll, and is considered part of the Hebrew Bible.

Readings
In the Masoretic Text of the Hebrew Bible (Tanakh), Parashat Va'eira has nine "open portion" (petuchah) divisions (roughly equivalent to paragraphs, often abbreviated with the Hebrew letter  (peh)). Parashat Va'eira has seven further subdivisions, called "closed portion" (setumah) divisions (abbreviated with the Hebrew letter  (samekh)) within the open portion divisions. The first and second open portion divisions divide the first reading. The third open portion covers the balance of the first and part of the second readings. The fourth open portion covers the balance of the second reading. The fifth open portion divides the fourth reading. The sixth open portion covers the balance of the fourth, all of the fifth, and part of the sixth readings. The seventh open portion separates part of the sixth reading. The eighth open portion covers the balance of the sixth and part of the seventh readings. And the ninth open portion covers the balance of the seventh reading. Closed portion divisions separate the first and second readings, separate the second and third readings, and divide the fourth, fifth, and sixth readings.

First reading — Exodus 6:2–13
In the first reading, God spoke to Moses, identified God's Self as the God of the Patriarchs, and acknowledged hearing the moaning of the Israelites. God instructed Moses to tell the Israelites that God would free them, make them God's people, and bring them to the Promised Land. But the Israelites would not listen because of their distress and hard labor. The first open portion ends here.

In the continuation of the reading, God told Moses to tell Pharaoh to let the Israelites go, but Moses complained that Pharaoh would not heed him, a man of impeded speech. The second open portion ends here.

In the continuation of the reading, God commanded Moses and Aaron to bring the Israelites out of Egypt. The first reading and a closed portion end here.

Second reading — Exodus 6:14–28
The second reading interjects a partial genealogy of Reuben, Simeon, and Levi, including Moses and his family.

The second reading and a closed portion end with the genealogy.

Third reading — Exodus 6:29–7:7
In the third reading, God instructed Moses to tell Pharaoh all that God would tell Moses, but Moses protested that he had a speech impediment. The third open portion ends here.

In the continuation of the reading, God placed Aaron in the role of Moses' prophet, to speak to Pharaoh. God intended to harden Pharaoh's heart, so that God might show signs and marvels, so that the Egyptians would know that the Lord was God. Moses and Aaron did as God commanded. Moses was 80 years old, and Aaron 83 years old, when they spoke to Pharaoh. The third reading and the fourth open portion end here.

Fourth reading — Exodus 7:8–8:6
In the fourth reading, God told how Aaron could cast down his rod and it would turn into a snake, and Aaron did so before Pharaoh. Pharaoh caused his magicians to do the same, but Aaron's rod swallowed their rods. Pharaoh's heart stiffened. A closed portion ends here.

In the continuation of the reading, God began visiting ten plagues on Egypt. God told Moses to go to Pharaoh at his morning bath, demand of him to let the Israelites go to worship in the wilderness, and have Aaron strike the Nile with his rod and turn it into blood. A closed portion ends here.

In the continuation of the reading, God told Moses to tell Aaron to stretch his rod over the waters of Egypt and turn them into blood. Moses and Aaron did so, killing the marine life and rendering the water unusable. But when the Egyptian magicians did the same, Pharaoh's heart stiffened. Seven days passed. The fifth open portion ends here.

As the reading continues, God told Moses to have Aaron hold his arm with the rod over the river and bring up frogs, and they did so. The magicians did the same. Pharaoh summoned Moses and Aaron to plead with God to remove the frogs and said he would let the Israelites go Moses asked Pharaoh when Moses should ask God, Pharaoh replied the next day, and Moses said that he would do so the next day, so that Pharaoh would know that there is none like God. The fourth reading ends here.

Fifth reading — Exodus 8:7–18
In the fifth reading, the frogs departed, but Pharaoh became stubborn and did not let the Israelites leave. A closed portion ends here.

In the continuation of the reading, God told Moses to have Aaron strike the dust with his rod, to turn it to lice throughout the land, and they did so. The magicians tried to do the same, but they could not. The magicians told Pharaoh, "This is the finger of God!" But Pharaoh's heart stiffened. A closed portion ends here.

In the continuation of the reading, God told Moses to rise early and stand before Pharaoh as he came to the water and tell him that God said, "Let My people go," or else God would send swarms of flies on Egypt, but not on Goshen. The fifth reading ends here.

Sixth reading — Exodus 8:19–9:16
In the sixth reading, God loosed swarms of insects and wild animals against the Egyptians, but not Goshen, where the Israelites dwelt. Pharaoh told Moses and Aaron to go sacrifice to God within Egypt, but Moses insisted on going three days into the wilderness. Pharaoh agreed, in exchange for Moses' prayer to lift the plague. But when God removed the insects and wild animals, Pharaoh became stubborn again. The sixth open portion ends here with the end of chapter .

As the reading continues with chapter , God struck the Egyptian's livestock with a pestilence, sparing the Israelites' livestock. But Pharaoh remained stubborn. The seventh open portion ends here.

In the continuation of the reading, God told Moses to take handfuls of soot from the kiln and throw it toward the sky, so that it would become fine dust, causing boils on man and beast throughout Egypt, and he did so. But God stiffened Pharaoh's heart. A closed portion ends here.

In the continuation of the reading, God told Moses to rise early and tell Pharaoh that God said, "Let My people go," or this time God would send all God's plagues upon Pharaoh and his people to demonstrate God's power. The sixth reading ends here,

Seventh reading — Exodus 9:17–35
In the seventh reading, God instructed Moses to threaten hail such as Egypt had never seen, and to instruct the Egyptians to bring their cattle in from the field so that they would not die. Those who feared God's word brought their slaves and livestock indoors, and those who did not fear God's word left them in the field. The eighth open portion ends here.

In the continuation of the reading, God told Moses to stretch out his hand, and God sent thunder and hail, which struck down all exposed in Egypt, but did not strike Goshen. Pharaoh confessed his wrong, agreed to let the Israelites go, and asked Moses and Aaron to pray to end the hail. Moses told Pharaoh that he would do so, and the hail would end so that Pharaoh would know that the earth is God's, but Moses knew that Pharaoh and his servants would not yet fear God. The hail had destroyed the flax and the barley, but not the wheat and the spelt, which ripened later.

In the maftir reading that concludes the parashah, Moses spread forth his hands to God, and the thunders and hail ceased, but when Pharaoh saw, he hardened his heart and did not let the Israelites go. The seventh reading, the ninth open portion, and the parashah end here with the end of chapter .

Readings according to the triennial cycle
Jews who read the Torah according to the triennial cycle of Torah reading read the parashah according to the following schedule:

In ancient parallels
The parashah has parallels in these ancient sources:

Exodus chapter 8
the 20th century Reform Rabbi Gunther Plaut reported that in Egyptian literature, a plague is called “the hand of God,” while among Babylonians, the expression was the name of a sickness.

In inner-biblical interpretation
The parashah has parallels or is discussed in these Biblical sources:

Exodus chapter 6

Exodus chapter 7

Exodus chapters 7–12
The description of the 10 plagues exhibits patterns and progressions, as follows:

 and  each recount differing arrangements of seven plagues.  recalls plagues of (1) blood, (2) flies, (3) frogs, (4) locusts, (5) hail, (6) livestock, and (7) firstborn, but not plagues of lice, boils, or darkness.  recalls plagues of (1) darkness, (2) blood, (3) frogs, (4) flies and lice, (5) hail, (6) locusts, and (7) firstborn, but not plagues of livestock or boils.

In early nonrabbinic interpretation
The parashah has parallels or is discussed in these early nonrabbinic sources:

Exodus chapter 6
But in order that human beings not be wholly without anything to call God, God allowed us to use the Name "Lord." God addressed this Name to mortal humans who have need of the Divine Name so that, if they cannot attain to the best thing, they may at least know the best possible Name. Philo suggested that God's statement in  meant that God had not revealed to them God's proper Name, but only that which could commonly be used. For Philo argued that God is so completely indescribable, that even those powers that minister to God do not announce God's proper Name to us. And thus after Jacob's wrestling match at the Jabok, Jacob asked the invisible master for a name, but Jacob's opponent did not tell him a proper name, saying that it was sufficient for Jacob to be taught ordinary explanations. But as for names that are the true symbols of things, we are taught not to seek them for the immortal.

In classical rabbinic interpretation
The parashah is discussed in these rabbinic sources from the era of the Mishnah and the Talmud:

Exodus chapter 6
But Moses did not keep this in mind, but came instead to doubt the wisdom of God's decree, and began to argue with God, saying in  "Lord, why have You dealt ill with this people?" For this reason, the Attribute of Justice sought to attack Moses, as  says: "And God spoke to Moses" (employing the name of God (Elohim) indicative of God's Justice). But when God reflected that Moses only asked this because of Israel's suffering, God retracted and dealt with Moses according to the Attribute of Mercy, as  says: "And He said to him: ‘I am the Lord'" (employing the name of God (the Tetragrammaton) indicative of God's Mercy). The Midrash taught that  refers to both Solomon and Moses. The Midrash taught that  refers to Solomon, for God gave some commandments for kings, as it says in  "Only he shall not multiply horses to himself . . . Neither shall he multiply wives to himself, that his heart turn not away; neither silver and gold." Solomon read in  that the reason of God's decree was "that his heart turn not away." The Midrash taught that Solomon thus thought to himself that he would multiply his wives but still not allow his heart to turn away. On account of this, the Midrash taught that at that point the wisdom and knowledge of Moses was only (in the words of ) "madness and folly."

The Midrash said that God told Moses that many times, God had revealed God's Self to Abraham, Isaac, and Jacob as God Almighty (El Shadai), and God had not made known to them that God's name is the Lord (the Tetragrammaton). But still they did not criticize God's ways. Yet when Isaac sought water to drink, he found none; instead (as  reports), "The herdsmen of Gerar strove with Isaac's herdsmen, saying: ‘The water is ours.'" Still Isaac did not murmur at God's ways. Yet when he sought a place to pitch his tent, he found none until he purchased one for a hundred kesitah (as reported in ). And still Jacob did not complain at God's ways. In contrast, at the commencement of God's commission of Moses, Moses inquired of God's name. Although the Israelites of that generation did not conduct themselves righteously, yet God heard their cry on account of the covenant that God had made with the Patriarchs. Therefore, say to the children of Israel." Thus, the Midrash taught that God swore to Moses that God would redeem the Israelites, so that Moses would have no reason to fear that the Attribute of Justice would retard their redemption.

Rabbi Simai noted that  does not say "to give you" but "to give them," implying that God would give the land to the Patriarchs personally, and thus that God would resurrect them so as to fulfill the promise.

A Baraita deduced from  that the Israelites' bondage in Egypt ended on Rosh Hashanah. The Baraita noted that  uses the word "burden" to describe the end of the Israelites' bondage in Egypt, and  uses the word "burden" to describe the end of Joseph's imprisonment, and the Baraita deduced that the two events must therefore have occurred at the same time of year. The Baraita further deduced from the words, "Blow the horn on the new moon, on the covering day for our festival . . . He appointed it for Joseph for a testimony when he went forth," in  that Joseph went forth from the prison on Rosh Hashanah.

Rabbi Nehemiah thus read  to mean: "I am the Lord, the One Who will bring you out from under the burdens of the Egyptians." The Gemara reported that the Rabbis of a Baraita, however, read  to mean: "When I shall bring you out, I will do for you something that will show you that I am the One Who brought you out from under the burdens of the Egyptians."

And thus the Mishnah taught that "On the eve of Passover, . . . even the poorest man in Israel must not eat until he reclines; and they (the overseers of charity) should give him not less than four cups of wine."

A Baraita taught that Rabbi Simai deduced from the similarity of the phrases "And I will take you to me for a people" and "And I will bring you in to the land" in  that the Israelites' Exodus from Egypt occurred under circumstances like their entry into the Land of Israel. Rabbi Simai thus deduced that just as only two out of 600,000 (Caleb and Joshua) entered the Promised Land, so only two out of every 600,000 Israelites in Egypt participated in the Exodus, and the rest died in Egypt. Rava taught that it will also be so when the Messiah comes that only a small portion of Jews will find redemption, for  says, "And she shall sing there, as in the days of her youth, and as in the days when she came up out of the land of Egypt," implying that circumstances upon the coming of the Messiah will be similar to those upon the Israelites' entry into the Land of Israel.

The Gemara asked why the Tannaim felt that the allocation of the Land of Israel "according to the names of the tribes of their fathers" in  meant that the allocation was with reference to those who left Egypt; perhaps, the Gemara supposed, it might have meant the 12 tribes and that the Land was to be divided into 12 equal portions?

Rabbi Ishmael cited  as one of ten a fortiori (kal va-chomer) arguments recorded in the Hebrew Bible: (1) In , Joseph's brothers told Joseph, "Behold, the money that we found in our sacks' mouths we brought back to you," and they thus reasoned, "how then should we steal?" (2) In , Moses told God, "Behold, the children of Israel have not hearkened to me," and reasoned that surely all the more, "How then shall Pharaoh hear me?" (3) In , Moses said to the Israelites, "Behold, while I am yet alive with you this day, you have been rebellious against the Lord," and reasoned that it would follow, "And how much more after my death?" (4) In , "the Lord said to Moses: ‘If her (Miriam's) father had but spit in her face,'" surely it would stand to reason, "‘Should she not hide in shame seven days?'" (5) In , the prophet asked, "If you have run with the footmen, and they have wearied you," is it not logical to conclude, "Then how can you contend with horses?" (6) In , David's men said to him, "Behold, we are afraid here in Judah," and thus surely it stands to reason, "How much more then if we go to Keilah?" (8)  reasoned, "Behold, the righteous shall be requited in the earth," and does it not follow, "How much more the wicked and the sinner?" (9) In , "The king said to Esther the queen: ‘The Jews have slain and destroyed 500 men in Shushan the castle,'" and it thus stands to reason, "‘What then have they done in the rest of the king's provinces?'" (10) In , God came to the prophet saying, "Behold, when it was whole, it was usable for no work," and thus surely it is logical to argue, "How much less, when the fire has devoured it, and it is singed?"

Rav Zeira taught that all the nations are uncircumcised in each of the first four ways, and all the house of Israel are uncircumcised in heart, in that their hearts do not allow them to do God's will. And Rav Zeira taught that in the future, God will take away from Israel the uncircumcision of their hearts, and they will not harden their stubborn hearts anymore before their Creator, as  says, "And I will take away the stony heart out of your flesh, and I will give you an heart of flesh," and  says, "And you shall be circumcised in the flesh of your foreskin."

And Moses did so, as  reports that Moses told Pharaoh that God said, "And all these your servants shall come down to Me." Moses did not say that Pharaoh would come down, only that Pharaoh's servants would do so. But Moses could well have said that Pharaoh himself would come down, for  reports, "Pharaoh arose at midnight." But Moses did not mention Pharaoh specifically so as to pay him respect.

A Midrash taught that Korah took issue with Moses in  because Moses had (as  reports) appointed Elizaphan the son of Uzziel as prince of the Kohathites, and Korah was (as  reports) son of Uzziel's older brother Izhar, and thus had a claim to leadership prior to Elizaphan.

Rava taught that he who wishes to take a wife should first inquire about the character of her brothers. For  reports, "And Aaron took Elisheva, the daughter of Amminadab, the sister of Nahshon." As  states "the daughter of Amminadab," it is obvious that she was the sister of Nahshon. So  expressly states "the sister of Nahshon" to imply that he who takes a wife should inquire about the character of her brothers, because most children resemble the brothers of their mother.

The Gemara then provided an alternative explanation:  could mean that Phinehas descended from Joseph, who conquered (pitpeit) his passions (resisting Potiphar's wife, as reported in ). But the Gemara asked, did not the tribes sneer at Phinehas and question how a youth (Phinehas) whose mother's father crammed calves for idol-worship could kill the head of a tribe in Israel (Zimri, Prince of Simeon, as reported in ). The Gemara explained that the real explanation was that Phinehas descended from both Joseph and Jethro. If Phinehas's mother's father descended from Joseph, then Phinehas's mother's mother descended from Jethro. And if Phinehas's mother's father descended from Jethro, then Phinehas's mother's mother descended from Joseph. The Gemara explained that  implies this dual explanation of "Putiel" when it says, "of the daughters of Putiel," because the plural "daughters" implies two lines of ancestry (from both Joseph and Jethro).

Rabbi Simeon noted that in nearly every instance, the Torah mentioned Moses before Aaron, but  mentioned Aaron before Moses, teaching that the two were deemed equivalent. The Gemara taught that the use of the pronoun "he (hu)" in an introduction, as in the words "These are (hu) that Aaron and Moses" in  signifies that they were the same in their righteousness from the beginning to the end.

Exodus chapter 7
The Tosefta cited , where the lesser Aaron spoke for the greater Moses, for the proposition that in synagogue reading, a minor may translate for an adult, but it is not honorable for an adult to translate for a minor.

Rabbi Phinehas taught that if the godless, for whose repentance God waits, do not do so, then later on, even when they do think of it, God distracts their hearts from penitence. Thus after several plagues, Pharaoh wished to pray to God, but God told Moses in  "Before he goes out [to pray to God], stand before Pharaoh."

The Pirke De-Rabbi Eliezer told that Moses quoted God's words in  back to God after the sin of the Golden Calf. The Pirke De-Rabbi Eliezer told that after the incident of the Golden Calf, God told Moses that the Israelites had forgotten God's might and had made an idol. But Moses noted that once the Israelites had sinned, God told Moses (in ), "Go, get down, for your people have corrupted themselves." Moses told God that the Israelites were indeed God's people, and God's inheritance, as  reports Moses saying, "Yet they are Your people and Your inheritance."

A Midrash read , “Then Pharaoh also called for the wise men and the sorcerers,” to teach that Scripture calls nonbelievers “wise men” when they do something that requires skill.

Rabbi Aivu bar Nagri said in the name of Rabbi Hiyya bar Abba that the words "with their enchantments" in  refer to sorcery without exogenous assistance, while the words "with their sorcery" in  refer to magic through the agency of demons.

When Pharaoh saw this, he was amazed and expressed his fear of what would happen if Moses now told the rod to swallow up Pharaoh and his throne. Rabbi Jose bar Hanina taught that a great miracle happened to that rod, for although it swallowed up all the rods that had been cast down, sufficient to make ten heaps, still the rod did not all become any thicker, and all who saw it recognized it as Aaron's rod. On this account, Aaron's rod became a symbol for all the miracles and wonders that were to be performed for Israel throughout the generations.

A Midrash noted that  reports that "Pharaoh's heart was hardened" without God's action, and that this was so for the first five plagues. As the first five plagues did not move Pharaoh to release the Israelites, God decreed that from then on, even if Pharaoh had agreed to release the Israelites, God would not accept it. Thus starting with the sixth plague and thereafter (as  reports), the text says, "the Lord hardened Pharaoh's heart."

It was taught in a Baraita that Rabbi Judah the Prince (or others say Rabbi Meir) used to say that Providence repays a person measure for measure. Thus, a Midrash taught that God sent the plagues against Pharaoh measure for measure. God changed the Egyptians' water into blood because the Egyptians prevented the Israelites from using the ritual bath (mikveh) so as to prevent the Israelite women from having marital relations with their husbands. God brought frogs because the Egyptians had ordered the Israelites to bring them reptiles and creeping creatures (which were an abomination to the Israelites). God sent lice because the Egyptians had made the Israelites clean the dirty streets and marketplaces. God sent swarms of wild animals because the Egyptians had demanded that the Israelites catch bears, lions, and leopards so as to separate the Israelite men from their wives. God brought the pestilence upon the Egyptians' cattle because they had forced the Israelites to serve as shepherds so as to keep the Israelite men away from their wives. God sent boils because the Egyptians had demanded that the Israelites warm things for them. God sent hail to destroy the Egyptians' crops because the Egyptians had sent the Israelites into the fields to plow and sow. God brought the locusts to destroy the Egyptians' grain because the Egyptians had forced the Israelites to plant wheat and barley for them. God brought darkness because among the Israelites were transgressors who had Egyptian patrons and lived in affluence and honor in Egypt and did not want to leave Egypt, and so God brought darkness so that God could kill these transgressors without the Egyptians' seeing.

And Abitol the barber, citing Rav, deduced from the words "Pharaoh . . . goes out to the water" in  that this Pharaoh was a magus who went to the water to perform sorcery.

Therefore, Pharaoh used to go early in the morning to the water (when no one else was there to witness that he relieved himself like other humans). God, therefore, told Moses to catch him just at this critical moment.

A Midrash cited  as one proof for the proposition that God does all things together: God puts to death and brings to life at the same time; God wounds and heals at the same time.

Rabbi Abin the Levite, the son of Rabbi Judah the Prince, taught that the Israelites became wealthy from the plague of blood. If an Egyptian and an Israelite were in a house where there was a barrel full of water, and the Egyptian went to fill a pitcher from the barrel, the Egyptian would find that it contained blood, while the Israelite would drink water from the same barrel. When the Egyptian asked the Israelite to give the Egyptian some water with the Israelite's own hand, it still became blood. Even if the Egyptian said to the Israelite that they should both drink from one vessel, the Israelite would drink water, but the Egyptian would drink blood. It was only when the Egyptian bought water from the Israelite for money that the Egyptian was able to drink water. And this is how the Israelites became rich.

The Gemara deduced from the use of the word for fish, dagah, in the phrase "And the fish that were in the river died" in  that the word dagah applies to fish both large and small.

A Midrash taught that the frogs were the most grievous of the ten plagues. The Midrash taught that the frogs destroyed the Egyptians' bodies, as  says "frogs . . . destroyed them," and the frogs emasculated the Egyptians, as  says that the frogs would "come into . . . [the Egyptians'] bed-chamber, and upon [their] bed." The Midrash taught that the frogs told the Egyptians that the coinage of their gods was abolished, and the Egyptians' own coinage — their ability to procreate — was also rendered invalid. The Midrash reasoned that as the word "destroyed" in  applied to checking procreation in the passage about Onan's seed, as "he destroyed it on the ground," so the Midrash reasoned that  means to convey that the Egyptians' procreation was checked as well when it says, "frogs . . . destroyed them." And the Midrash deduced that the frogs spoke because  says, "concerning the frogs," and the words for "concerning," al debar, may also be read, "because of the words of."

Thaddeus of Rome taught that Hananiah, Mishael and Azariah (also known as Shadrach, Meshach, and Abednego) delivered themselves to the Fiery Furnace to sanctify the Divine Name in  because they deduced from  that the frogs of the plague, which had not been commanded to sanctify the Divine Name, nonetheless jumped into hot ovens at God's behest. So Hananiah, Mishael and Azariah reasoned that people, whom  does command to sanctify the Divine Name, should be willing to bear hot ovens for that reason.

Exodus chapter 8
Rabbi Eleazar taught that when  ( in the KJV) reports that "the frog came up, and covered the land of Egypt," it was initially just one frog, which bred prolifically and filled the land. The Tannaim disputed the matter. Rabbi Akiva said that one frog filled the whole of Egypt by breeding. But Rabbi Eleazar ben Azariah chastised Akiva for dabbling in aggadah, and taught that one frog croaked for others, and they joined the first frog.

The Midrash taught that the words, "A man's pride shall bring him low," apply to Pharaoh, who in  haughtily asked, "Who is the Lord that I should hearken to His voice?" and so, as  reports, God "overthrew Pharaoh and his host."

Rav Papa said that a spirit cannot even produce something the size of a camel, but a spirit can collect the elements of a larger object and thus produce the illusion of creating it, but a spirit cannot do even that with a smaller object.

Thus, when God told Moses to slay the paschal lamb (as reflected in ), Moses asked God how he could possibly do so, when the lamb was as Egyptian god. God replied that the Israelites would not depart from Egypt until they slaughtered the Egyptian gods before the Egyptians' eyes, so that God might teach them that their gods were really nothing at all. And thus God did so, for on the same night that God slew the Egyptian firstborn, the Israelites slaughtered their paschal lambs and ate them. When the Egyptians saw their firstborn slain and their gods slaughtered, they could do nothing, as  reports, "While the Egyptians were burying them whom the Lord had smitten among them, even all their firstborn; upon their gods also the Lord executed judgment."

Exodus chapter 9
The Pirke De-Rabbi Eliezer taught that for every plague that God brought upon the Egyptians, the magicians also produced the plague, until God brought upon them the boils, and then the magicians were not able to stand to do likewise, as  says, "And the magicians could not stand before Moses because of the boils."

A Midrash taught that when God perceived that Pharaoh did not relent after the first five plagues, God decided that even if Pharaoh now wished to repent, God would harden Pharaoh's heart in order to exact the whole punishment from him. Thus  reports that "the Lord hardened the heart of Pharaoh."

In , Pharaoh's heart is hardened. A Midrash catalogued the wide range of additional capabilities of the heart reported in the Hebrew Bible. The heart speaks, sees, hears, walks, falls, stands, rejoices, cries, is comforted, is troubled, grows faint, grieves, fears, can be broken, becomes proud, rebels, invents, cavils, overflows, devises, desires, goes astray, lusts, is refreshed, can be stolen, is humbled, is enticed, errs, trembles, is awakened, loves, hates, envies, is searched, is rent, meditates, is like a fire, is like a stone, turns in repentance, becomes hot, dies, melts, takes in words, is susceptible to fear, gives thanks, covets, becomes hard, makes merry, acts deceitfully, speaks from out of itself, loves bribes, writes words, plans, receives commandments, acts with pride, makes arrangements, and aggrandizes itself.

 sets forth the plague of hail. A Midrash taught that they were stones (avanim) which remained suspended for the sake of a man (al gav ish) and came down for the sake of a man. The hailstones remained suspended for the sake of a man — this was Moses, of whom  says, "Now the man Moses was very meek," and  says, "And the thunder and hail ceased, and the rain poured not upon the earth." The hailstones came down for the sake of a man — this was Joshua, of whom  says, "Take Joshua the son of Nun, a man in whom there is spirit," and  says, "And it came to pass as they fled from before Israel, while they were at the descent of Beth-Horon, that the Lord cast down great stones."

Rabbi Nechunia, son of Hakkanah, taught that God killed Pharaoh, and then because of Pharaoh's repentance, delivered him from among the dead.

Reading , “Those among Pharaoh’s courtiers who feared the Lord’s word brought their slaves and livestock indoors to safety,” the Midrash HaGadol taught that one can surely draw the inference that if those who fear God on a particular occasion are saved from punishment, how much more will those who fear God all their life be saved.

The Pharisees noted that while in  Pharaoh asked who God was, once God had smitten him, in  Pharaoh acknowledged that God was righteous. Citing this juxtaposition, the Pharisees complained against heretics who placed the name of earthly rulers above the name of God.

The Mishnah echoed  by listing wheat, barley, and spelt as typical grains.

Interpreting , "And when Pharaoh saw that the rain and the hail and the thunders had ceased, he sinned yet more," a Midrash taught that so it always is with the wicked: As long as they are in trouble, they humble themselves. But as soon as trouble passes, they return to their perversity.

In medieval Jewish interpretation
The parashah is discussed in these medieval Jewish sources:

Exodus chapter 6

Rashi taught that the phrase "I am the Lord" in  meant that God is faithful to recompense all those who followed God - faithful to punish when the phrase appears together with a punishment, and faithful to reward when the phrase appears together with a commandment.

Ibn Ezra quotes Jeshua ben Judah as saying that Abraham and Jacob literally did not know the Name , YHVH, but Moses filled it in when writing down the Torah. However, he disagrees with this, asking how Moses could dare to write a name that God had not uttered.

Rashi noted that  does not say, "but My Name YHVH I did not inform them," but, "I did not become known." According to Rashi, the name YHVH indicates God's attribute of faithfulness, but as the Divine promises to the patriarchs were not fulfilled in their lifetimes, the meaning of name YHVH was not made tangible to them (even as the name itself was used in speech).

Nahmanides read God to say in  that God appeared to the Patriarchs in God's form of El Shaddai, in which God performs hidden miracles that appear to the observer as part of the natural order. But God did not appear to them in God's form of YHVH, with which God performs open miracles that subvert the natural order.

Exodus chapter 7
Ibn Ezra answered that God granted people wisdom and implanted in their hearts the intelligence to receive power from on high to add to their good or diminish the evil destined to befall them.

The offender would thus be prevented from doing repentance, and would not have the power to return from the offense, and the offender would die and be lost because of the offense. Similarly  reports, "They ridiculed the messengers of God, disdained His words and insulted His prophets until the anger of God rose upon the people, without possibility of healing." Maimonides interpreted these verses to teach that they sinned willingly and to such an egregious extent that they deserved to have repentance withheld from them. Maimonides explained that God sent Moses to tell Pharaoh to send out the Jews and do repentance, when God had already told Moses that Pharaoh would refuse, because God sought to inform humanity that when God withholds repentance from a sinner, the sinner will not be able to repent. Maimonides made clear that God did not decree that Pharaoh harm the Jewish people; rather, Pharaoh sinned willifully on his own, and he thus deserved to have the privilege of repentance withheld from him.<ref>Maimonides, Mishneh Torah: Hilchot Teshuvah (The Laws of Repentance), chapter 3, halachah 3 (Egypt, circa 1170–1180); in, e.g., Mishneh Torah: Hilchot Teshuvah: The Laws of Repentance, translated by Eliyahu Touger (New York: Moznaim Publishing, 1990), pages 140–48; see also Maimonides, The Eight Chapters on Ethics, chapter 8 (Egypt, late 12th century); in, e.g., The Eight Chapters of Maimonides on Ethics (Shemonah Perakim): A Psychological and Ethical Treatise, edited, annotated, and translated, with an introduction by Joseph I. Gorfinkle (New York: Columbia University Press, 1912; reprinted by Forgotten Books, 2012), pages 95–96.</ref>

The Zohar taught that the “mixed multitude” (erev rav) mentioned in  consisted entirely of Egyptian sorcerers and magicians, who sought to oppose God's works, as  reports, “And the magicians of Egypt, they also did in like manner with their enchantments.” When they beheld the signs and the wonders that Moses performed, they came to Moses to be converted. God advised Moses not to accept them, but Moses argued that now that they had seen God's power, they desired to accept the Israelites’ Faith, and if they saw God's power every day, they would learn that there is no God like God. So Moses accepted them.  called them a “mixed multitude” because they consisted of all the grades of Egyptian magicians, at their head being Jannes and Jambres. During the day, these wizards practiced their enchantments, and after sunset, they made observations of the heavens until the middle of the ninth hour, which was called the “great evening” (erev rav, which means both “great multitude” and “great evening”). The lesser magicians then made observation after that until midnight. The Egyptians, who had great faith in the chief wizards, thus called them the “great evening” (erev rav).

Exodus chapter 8

Rashbam, however, read , “This is the finger of God,” to indicate that the magicians assessed that the plague was a natural disaster not caused by Moses and Aaron, for if the lice had resulted from the sorcery of Moses and Aaron, then the magicians would have been able to replicate it. Ibn Ezra and Hezekiah ben Manoah (Hizkuni) similarly read the magicians’ remark to indicate that the magicians thought that a natural disaster had caused the plague, because the magicians said, “This is the finger of God,” and not, “This is the finger of the Lord.”

Exodus chapter 9

In modern interpretation
The parashah is discussed in these modern sources:

Exodus chapter 6
Israeli Bible scholar Nahama Leibowitz identified the following chiastic structure in God's speech to Moses in 

2And God spoke to Moses, and said to him:

A: "I am the Lord;
B: 3And I appeared to Abraham, to Isaac, and to Jacob, as God Almighty, but by My name YHWH I made Me not known to them.
C: 4And I have also established My covenant with them, to give them the land of Canaan, the land of their sojournings, wherein they sojourned.
D: 5And moreover I have heard the groaning of the children of Israel, whom the Egyptians keep in bondage; and I have remembered My covenant.
E: 6Therefore say to the children of Israel: I am the Lord, and I will bring you out from under the burdens of the Egyptians, and I will deliver you from their bondage, and I will redeem you with an outstretched arm, and with great judgments;
D1: 7And I will take you to Me for a people, and I will be to you a God; and you shall know that I am the Lord your God, who brought you out from under the burdens of the Egyptians.
C1: 8And I will bring you in to the land, concerning which I lifted up My hand to give it
B1: to Abraham, to Isaac, and to Jacob; and I will give it you for a heritage:
A1: I am the Lord."

, El, was the high god of the Canaanite pantheon (although the Hebrew word is also a common noun meaning “god”), and some scholars link , Shaddai, with a term for “mountain,” and others associate it with fertility.

Plaut reports that Biblical scholars have attempted to solve this contradiction in various ways, many positing that  belongs to the Priestly source, which held that the Patriarchs knew God only as Elohim or El Shaddai, and that God first disclosed the Name YHVH, to Moses. According to this theory, the passages in Genesis that use the Name YHVH, and the passages in  that refer to YHVH, are assigned to the J tradition. Acknowledging that this explanation does not address the text as it is now, Plaut presented the alternative explanation (which Plaut attributed to the Israeli scholar Yehezkel Kaufmann) that Moses and the people had since patriarchal time known the Name YHVH, as God's name, but this knowledge had hardly been more than a “customary appellation.” In , however, after his first trials and failures, Moses confronted God again, and this time God revealed the Name more fully, which is to say that Moses saw God more clearly than before, in a new light. According to Martin Buber, Yahu was a kind of “primitive sound,” an exclamation denoting awe, recognition, and affirmation: “Oh is the one!” or “Yah is the one!” or “Yah is!” or “Yah exists!” Finally, Plaut related yet another approach, seeing YHVH, as having developed from a cultic name connected with El, perhaps El du Yahwi — “El who creates” — and that in time the Name Yahwi split off from El, ousting the Name El from preeminence.

Sarna and Tigay noted that , “I will take you to Me for a people, and I will be to you a God,” prefigures the covenant that God would establish at Sinai.

Alter called “the cornerstone of Israelite faith” that God had proven God's divinity and attachment to Israel by liberating the Israelites from Egyptian slavery. Alter reported that some modern scholars, arguing from the absence of Egyptian evidence on any Hebrew slave population or any mention of an exodus, have raised doubts about whether the Hebrews were ever in Egypt. Alter concluded that the story is surely a schematization and simplification of complex historical processes. Alter viewed it quite likely that a sizeable segment of the Hebrew people remained in the high country of eastern Canaan and never went down to Egypt. Yet Alter also found it hard to imagine that the Israelites would have invented a story of national origins involving the humiliation of slavery without some kernel of historical memory.

Exodus chapter 7
Baruch Spinoza deduced from  that in Scripture, the word "prophet" (navi) means "interpreter of God."

Greta Hort argued that the plagues concentrated within a period of about 12 months, based on the report of  that Moses was 80 years old when he first spoke with pharaoh and the report of  that Moses was 120 years old when he died, after spending 40 years in the wilderness.

Sarna explained that Moses thus tacitly asserted his equal status with Pharaoh. Moses came to negotiate with Pharaoh as the representative of the people of Israel. Just as Pharaoh had his magicians, Moses had his assistant, Aaron. Sarna noted that in the narratives of the Ten Plagues, Aaron acted only as long as the Egyptian magicians appeared present. After their ingenuity failed them and they faded from the story, Moses acted personally to bring about the remaining plagues.

Everett Fox noted that “glory” (kevod) and “stubbornness” (kaved lev) are leading words throughout the book of Exodus that give it a sense of unity.

Plaut wrote that the Habiru were a class of people who lived in the Fertile Crescent during the 19th to 14th centuries B.C.E. who may originally have come from Arabia, became prominent in Mesopotamia, and later spread to Egypt. The Habiru followed distinct occupations, particularly mercenaries and administrators. Although at first they were nomads or seminomads, they later settled, but were usually considered foreigners and maintaining their group identity. The term Habiru referred not so much to an ethnic or linguistic group as to a social or political group. Plaut reported that the words Habiru and “Hebrew” (Ivri) appear to share a common linguistic root. Plaut concluded that Israelites in Egypt likely occupied positions similar to, or because of familial ties were identified with, the Habiru. When non-Israelites repeatedly applied the term to the Israelites, the Israelites themselves began to use the name Habiru, which they pronounced Ivri. Plaut considered it possible that for some time the term Ivri was used only when the Israelites spoke of themselves to outsiders and when outsiders referred to them.

Plaut reported that most moderns take the view that the plague stories are unacceptable as fact and must be deemed legendary and unhistorical. Plaut argued that it was a mistake to consider the stories literally rather than as “essentially interpretive and legendary” — asserting that the release of the Israelites from slavery was unprecedented and could only be explained by crediting God. Plaut suggested that there was “possibly or even likely” a historical kernel that the biblical tradition transposed into the moral religious realm. Thus Plaut noted that some claim that the bloodiness of the Nile was caused by special deposits that the river picked up from the mountains (hence the name "Red Nile” for one branch); that frogs accompanied a large-scale inundation; and that lice, gnats, and insects regularly infested the area. Plaut concluded that the plague stories teach: “Israel's redemption was the ultimate marvel, and it was caused by God. To bring it about, nature itself was harnessed, the drama of the plagues was unfolded, and the ground was laid for an experience that forever after was etched into the hearts of the people and their descendants.”

John J. Collins reported that some scholars have suggested that the plague stories contain a reminiscence of a mid-fourteenth century BCE epidemic referred to as “the Asiatic illness.”

Collins argued that the plague stories show that Exodus is not only the story of the liberation of Israel, but also of the defeat and humiliation of the Egyptians, and thus involved “less than edifying” nationalistic, ethnic vengeance.

Sarna suggested that the biblical narrator might have construed the affliction of the Nile's waters and the plague of frogs as a kind of retribution for the pharaoh's decrees ordering the killing of male Israelites at birth and their drowning in the Nile.

Exodus chapter 8

Alter noted that the narrative preceding  repeatedly spoke of God's “hand” or “arm,” but Pharaoh's magicians appear to concede a lesser trace of divine action in mentioning God's “finger.”

Exodus chapter 9
Reading the report of  that “all the livestock of Egypt died,” but noting that  reports that boils subsequently struck the animals, Plaut concluded that  must be taken as hyperbole.

Moritz Markus Kalisch reported an interpretation that  indicated a test by Moses of how far the fear of God had spread among the Egyptians.

Benno Jacob read  to indicate that some of Pharaoh's servants had become frightened of God's warning through Moses.

Reading , “Whoever feared the Lord’s word,” Alter wrote that whereas elsewhere, this idiom indicates piety (as in “God-fearing”), here it has been stripped down to its literal meaning of whoever was struck with terror by God's grim threat.

In critical analysis

Some scholars who follow the Documentary Hypothesis find evidence of three or even four separate sources in the parashah. Walter Brueggemann reported that older source analysis saw  as an insertion by the Priestly source, addressed to a community in exile (or just out of exile), appealing to very old tradition to create a sense of structured, stable reality to give coherence, order, and legitimacy to communal life. Richard Elliott Friedman, however, saw four sources in  alone. Friedman agreed with Brueggemann in attributing  and 30 to the Priestly source who wrote in the 6th or 5th century BCE. But Friedman attributed  and 26–28 to a later Redactor (sometimes abbreviated R).

For a color-coded display of verses according to this hypothesis, see the display of Exodus according to the Documentary Hypothesis at Wikiversity.

Commandments
According to Maimonides and Sefer ha-Chinuch, there are no commandments in the parashah.

In the liturgy

Next, the Haggadah recounts the reasoning of Rabbi Jose the Galilean that as the phrase "the finger of God" in  referred to 10 plagues, "the great hand" (translated "the great work") in  must refer to 50 plagues upon the Egyptians.

Haftarah

Generally

Connection to the Parashah
Both the parashah and the haftarah describe God's instructions to a prophet to confront the Pharaoh of Egypt and bring on Israel's redemption. Both the parashah and the haftarah address God's judgments (shefatim) against Pharaoh and Egypt. A monster (tannin) plays a role in both the parashah and the haftarah: In the parashah, God turns Moses' rod into a monster; the haftarah describes Pharaoh as a monster. In both the parashah and the haftarah, God attacks the river and kills fish. In both the parashah and the haftarah, God's actions would cause the Egyptians to know (ve-yade'u) God. And in both the parashah and the haftarah, God proclaims, "I am the Lord."

On Shabbat Rosh Chodesh

Notes

Further reading
The parashah has parallels or is discussed in these sources:

Biblical
 (El Shaddai);  (El Shaddai);  (El Shaddai);  (El Shaddai);  (El Shaddai);  (Shaddai).
 (God lifted up God's hand).
;  (hardening of heart).
 (hardening of heart).
 (I will be your God and you will be my people);  (you will be my people, and I will be your God);  (you will be my people, and I will be your God);  (31:33 in NJPS) (I will be their God, and they will be my people).
 (God lifted up God's hand);  (you will be my people, and I will be your God).
 (name is the Lord);  (plagues);  (plagues).
 (God lifted up God's hand).

Early nonrabbinic
Ezekiel the Tragedian. Exagōgē. 2nd century BCE. Translated by R.G. Robertson. In The Old Testament Pseudepigrapha: Volume 2: Expansions of the "Old Testament" and Legends, Wisdom and Philosophical Literature, Prayers, Psalms, and Odes, Fragments of Lost Judeo-Hellenistic works. Edited by James H. Charlesworth, page 814. New York: Anchor Bible, 1985.
Philo. Allegorical Interpretation 1: 13:40; 3: 14:43; 60:172; On the Birth of Abel and the Sacrifices Offered by Him and by His Brother Cain 3:9; 12:51; 19:69; That the Worse Is Wont To Attack the Better 12:38–39; On the Posterity of Cain and His Exile 22:76; On Drunkenness 26:101; On the Confusion of Tongues 9:29; 20:94; On the Migration of Abraham 15:83–85; On Flight and Finding 3:18; 23:124; On the Change of Names 2:13; 3:20–21; 22:125; 37:207; On Dreams, That They Are God-Sent 2:28:189; 39:259; 42:277. Alexandria, Egypt, early 1st century CE. In, e.g., The Works of Philo: Complete and Unabridged, New Updated Edition. Translated by Charles Duke Yonge, pages 29, 55, 69, 95, 100, 103, 116, 139, 215, 237, 242, 261, 322, 332, 342–43, 352, 359, 401, 407–08. Peabody, Massachusetts: Hendrickson Publishers, 1993.
Romans  1st century. (hardening Pharaoh's heart).
2 Timothy  Rome, 67 CE. (magicians opposing Moses).
 (frogs);  (changing hearts to God's purpose). Late 1st century CE.
Josephus. The Wars of the Jews, 5:9:4. Circa 75 CE. In, e.g., The Works of Josephus: Complete and Unabridged, New Updated Edition. Translated by William Whiston, page 716. Peabody, Massachusetts: Hendrickson Publishers, 1987.
Josephus. Antiquities of the Jews 2:13:3–2:14:4 . Circa 93–94. In, e.g., The Works of Josephus: Complete and Unabridged, New Updated Edition. Translated by William Whiston, pages 72–74. Peabody, Massachusetts: Hendrickson Publishers, 1987.

Qur'an 7:103–126, 130–135; 10:75–83; 11:96–97; 17:101–102; 20:42–73; 23:45–48; 26:10–51; 28:36–39; 29:39; 40:23-27, 37; 43:46–54; 51:38–39; 73:15–16; 79:15–24. Arabia, 7th century.

Classical rabbinic
Mishnah: Orlah 1:1–3:9; Pesachim 10:1; Shevuot 5:3; Yadayim 4:8. Land of Israel, circa 200 CE. In, e.g., The Mishnah: A New Translation. Translated by Jacob Neusner, pages 158–66, 249, 630, 1131. New Haven: Yale University Press, 1988.
Jerusalem Talmud: Pesachim 42b; Rosh Hashanah 20b; Megillah 13b; Chagigah 4a, 11a; Yevamot 63a; Sotah 10a, 28b; Sanhedrin 26b; Makkot 9a. Tiberias, Land of Israel, circa 400 CE. In, e.g., Talmud Yerushalmi. Edited by Chaim Malinowitz, Yisroel Simcha Schorr, and Mordechai Marcus, volumes 18, 24, 26–27, 30, 36, 44, 49. Brooklyn: Mesorah Publications, 2011–2019. And in, e.g., The Jerusalem Talmud: A Translation and Commentary. Edited by Jacob Neusner and translated by Jacob Neusner, Tzvee Zahavy, B. Barry Levy, and Edward Goldman. Peabody, Massachusetts: Hendrickson Publishers, 2009.
Genesis Rabbah 1:15; 5:7; 18:5; 19:7; 37:3; 46:1, 5; 82:3; 88:5; 92:7; 96, 97. Land of Israel, 5th century. In, e.g., Midrash Rabbah: Genesis. Translated by Harry Freedman and Maurice Simon, volume 1, pages 14, 37–38, 144, 153, 296, 389, 392; volume 2, pages 754, 816, 853, 898, 929. London: Soncino Press, 1939.
Mekhilta of Rabbi Ishmael Beshallah 7. Land of Israel, late 4th century. In, e.g., Mekhilta de-Rabbi Ishmael. Translated by Jacob Z. Lauterbach, volume 1, page 166. Philadelphia: Jewish Publication Society, 1933, reissued 2004.

Mekhilta of Rabbi Simeon 2:1–2, 5; 3:1; 15:4–5; 16:1, 4; 19:4; 21:4; 22:6; 26:3, 6; 35:1; 47:2. Land of Israel, 5th century. In, e.g., Mekhilta de-Rabbi Shimon bar Yohai. Translated by W. David Nelson, pages 5–7, 9–11, 50–51, 54, 56, 78–79, 89, 93, 114, 117, 150, 209. Philadelphia: Jewish Publication Society, 2006.
Babylonian Talmud: Berakhot 38a, 54b; Shabbat 97a; Eruvin 83b; Pesachim 53b, 99b; Rosh Hashanah 11b; Megillah 11a; Moed Katan 6a, 18a; Chagigah 13b; Nedarim 51b; Sotah 11b, 43a; Bava Kamma 80b; Bava Batra 91a, 109b–10a, 116a, 117b; Sanhedrin 12a, 58b, 67b, 82b, 90b, 111a; Shevuot 35b; Menachot 68b, 84a; Chullin 134a; Bekhorot 41a. Babylonia, 6th century. In, e.g., Talmud Bavli. Edited by Yisroel Simcha Schorr, Chaim Malinowitz, and Mordechai Marcus, 72 volumes. Brooklyn: Mesorah Pubs., 2006.

Medieval
Saadia Gaon. Emunoth ve-Deoth (Beliefs and Opinions). Baghdad, Babylonia, 933. In, e.g., The Book of Beliefs and Opinions. Translated by Samuel Rosenblatt, pages 29, 116–17, 152, 154, 199, 411. New Haven: Yale University Press, 1948.
Exodus Rabbah 5:14, 6:1–12:7, 23:9, 25:27, 28:4. 10th century. In, e.g., Midrash Rabbah: Exodus. Translated by Simon M. Lehrman, volume 3. London: Soncino Press, 1939.
Rashi. Commentary. Exodus 6–9. Troyes, France, late 11th century. In, e.g., Rashi. The Torah: With Rashi's Commentary Translated, Annotated, and Elucidated. Translated and annotated by Yisrael Isser Zvi Herczeg, volume 2, pages 53–90. Brooklyn: Mesorah Publications, 1994.

Rashbam. Commentary on the Torah. Troyes, early 12th century. In, e.g., Rashbam's Commentary on Exodus: An Annotated Translation. Edited and translated by Martin I. Lockshin, pages 59–92. Atlanta: Scholars Press, 1997.
Judah Halevi. Kuzari. 1:25; 2:2. Toledo, Spain, 1130–1140. In, e.g., Jehuda Halevi. Kuzari: An Argument for the Faith of Israel. Introduction by Henry Slonimsky, pages 46, 86. New York: Schocken, 1964.
Abraham ibn Ezra. Commentary on the Torah. France, 1153. In, e.g., Ibn Ezra's Commentary on the Pentateuch: Exodus (Shemot). Translated and annotated by H. Norman Strickman and Arthur M. Silver, volume 2, pages 129–82. New York: Menorah Publishing Company, 1996.
Maimonides. Mishneh Torah: Hilchot Teshuvah (The Laws of Repentance), chapter 3, halachah 3. Egypt. Circa 1170–1180. In, e.g., Mishneh Torah: Hilchot Teshuvah: The Laws of Repentance. Translated by Eliyahu Touger, pages 140–48. New York: Moznaim Publishing, 1990.

Maimonides. Mishneh Torah: Hilchot Chometz U'Matzah (The Laws of Chametz and Matzah), chapter 7, halachah 7. Egypt, circa 1170–1180. In, e.g., Mishneh Torah: Hilchot Chametz U'Matzah: The Laws of Chametz and Matzah: The Rambam's Text of the Haggadah. Translated by Eliyahu Touger. New York: Moznaim Publishing, 1988.
Maimonides. The Eight Chapters on Ethics, chapter 8. Egypt. Late 12th century. In, e.g., The Eight Chapters of Maimonides on Ethics (Shemonah Perakim): A Psychological and Ethical Treatise. Edited, annotated, and translated, with an introduction by Joseph I. Gorfinkle, pages 95–96. New York: Columbia University Press, 1912. Reprinted by Forgotten Books, 2012.
Maimonides. The Guide for the Perplexed, part 1, chapters 24, 45– 46; part 2, chapter 35; part 3, chapters 29, 46, 54. Cairo, Egypt, 1190. In, e.g., Moses Maimonides. The Guide for the Perplexed. Translated by Michael Friedländer, pages 33, 58, 61, 224, 318, 359, 397. New York: Dover Publications, 1956.
Jacob Anatoli. "Sermon on Wa-'Era: A Homily on Education." First half of 13th century. In Marc Saperstein. Jewish Preaching, 1200–1800: An Anthology, pages 113–23. New Haven: Yale University Press, 1989.
Hezekiah ben Manoah. Hizkuni. France, circa 1240. In, e.g., Chizkiyahu ben Manoach. Chizkuni: Torah Commentary. Translated and annotated by Eliyahu Munk, volume 2, pages 382–99. Jerusalem: Ktav Publishers, 2013.
Nachmanides. Commentary on the Torah. Jerusalem, circa 1270. In, e.g., Ramban (Nachmanides): Commentary on the Torah. Translated by Charles B. Chavel, volume 2, pages 63–99. New York: Shilo Publishing House, 1973.
Zohar 2:22a–32a. Spain, late 13th century. In, e.g., The Zohar. Translated by Harry Sperling and Maurice Simon. 5 volumes. London: Soncino Press, 1934.
Bahya ben Asher. Commentary on the Torah. Spain, early 14th century. In, e.g., Midrash Rabbeinu Bachya: Torah Commentary by Rabbi Bachya ben Asher. Translated and annotated by Eliyahu Munk, volume 3, pages 815–54. Jerusalem: Lambda Publishers, 2003.
Jacob ben Asher (Baal Ha-Turim). Commentary on the Torah. Early 14th century. In, e.g., Baal Haturim Chumash: Shemos/Exodus. Translated by Eliyahu Touger; edited and annotated by Avie Gold, volume 2, pages 569–607. Brooklyn: Mesorah Publications, 2000.
Isaac ben Moses Arama. Akedat Yizhak (The Binding of Isaac). Late 15th century. In, e.g., Yitzchak Arama. Akeydat Yitzchak: Commentary of Rabbi Yitzchak Arama on the Torah. Translated and condensed by Eliyahu Munk, volume 1, pages 331–45. New York, Lambda Publishers, 2001.

Modern
Isaac Abravanel. Commentary on the Torah. Italy, between 1492 and 1509. In, e.g., Abarbanel: Selected Commentaries on the Torah: Volume 2: Shemos/Exodus. Translated and annotated by Israel Lazar, pages 85–133. Brooklyn: CreateSpace, 2015.
Abraham Saba. Ẓeror ha-Mor (Bundle of Myrrh). Fez, Morocco, circa 1500. In, e.g., Tzror Hamor: Torah Commentary by Rabbi Avraham Sabba. Translated and annotated by Eliyahu Munk, volume 3, pages 895–920. Jerusalem, Lambda Publishers, 2008.
Obadiah ben Jacob Sforno. Commentary on the Torah. Venice, 1567. In, e.g., Sforno: Commentary on the Torah. Translation and explanatory notes by Raphael Pelcovitz, pages 308–27. Brooklyn: Mesorah Publications, 1997.
Moshe Alshich. Commentary on the Torah. Safed, circa 1593. In, e.g., Moshe Alshich. Midrash of Rabbi Moshe Alshich on the Torah. Translated and annotated by Eliyahu Munk, volume 2, pages 375–400. New York, Lambda Publishers, 2000.
Shlomo Ephraim Luntschitz. Kli Yakar. Lublin, 1602. In, e.g., Kli Yakar: Shemos. Translated by Elihu Levine, volume 1, pages 80–130. Southfield, Michigan: Targum Press/Feldheim Publishers, 2002.

Avraham Yehoshua Heschel. Commentaries on the Torah. Cracow, Poland, mid 17th century. Compiled as Chanukat HaTorah. Edited by Chanoch Henoch Erzohn. Piotrkow, Poland, 1900. In Avraham Yehoshua Heschel. Chanukas HaTorah: Mystical Insights of Rav Avraham Yehoshua Heschel on Chumash. Translated by Avraham Peretz Friedman, pages 125–31. Southfield, Michigan: Targum Press/Feldheim Publishers, 2004.
Thomas Hobbes. Leviathan, 3:36, 37. England, 1651. Reprint edited by C. B. Macpherson, pages 456, 474. Harmondsworth, England: Penguin Classics, 1982.
Chaim ibn Attar. Ohr ha-Chaim. Venice, 1742. In Chayim ben Attar. Or Hachayim: Commentary on the Torah. Translated by Eliyahu Munk, volume 2, pages 499–533. Brooklyn: Lambda Publishers, 1999.

Nachman of Breslov. Teachings. Bratslav, Ukraine, before 1811. In Rebbe Nachman's Torah: Breslov Insights into the Weekly Torah Reading: Exodus-Leviticus. Compiled by Chaim Kramer; edited by Y. Hall, pages 56–63. Jerusalem: Breslov Research Institute, 2011.

George Eliot. Adam Bede, chapter 32. Edinburgh and London: William Blackwood and Sons, 1859. Reprinted, e.g., edited by Carol A. Martin, page 313. Oxford: Oxford University Press, 2008. (when the Squire threatens to replace the Poysers with a new tenant, Mr. Thurle, Mrs. Poyser tells the Squire, “I say, if Mr Thurle’s so ready to take farms under you, it’s a pity but what he should take this, and see if he likes to live in a house wi’ all the plagues o’ Egypt in’t — wi’ the cellar full o’ water, and frogs and toads hoppin’ up the steps by dozens.”).
Samson Raphael Hirsch. The Pentateuch: Exodus. Translated by Isaac Levy, volume 2, pages 63–106. Gateshead: Judaica Press, 2nd edition 1999. Originally published as Der Pentateuch uebersetzt und erklaert. Frankfurt, 1867–1878.
Samuel David Luzzatto (Shadal). Commentary on the Torah. Padua, 1871. In, e.g., Samuel David Luzzatto. Torah Commentary. Translated and annotated by Eliyahu Munk, volume 2, pages 561–93. New York: Lambda Publishers, 2012.

Malbim. The Torah and the Commandments. Warsaw, 1874–80. In, e.g., Malbim: Rabbenu Meir Leibush ben Yechiel Michel. Commentary on the Torah. Translated by Zvi Faier, volume 4, pages 158–252. Israel: M.P. Press/Hillel Press, 1984.  (1982).
Yehudah Aryeh Leib Alter. Sefat Emet. Góra Kalwaria (Ger), Poland, before 1906. Excerpted in The Language of Truth: The Torah Commentary of Sefat Emet. Translated and interpreted by Arthur Green, pages 87–91. Philadelphia: Jewish Publication Society, 1998. Reprinted 2012.

Hermann Cohen. Religion of Reason: Out of the Sources of Judaism. Translated with an introduction by Simon Kaplan; introductory essays by Leo Strauss, page 39. New York: Ungar, 1972. Reprinted Atlanta: Scholars Press, 1995. Originally published as Religion der Vernunft aus den Quellen des Judentums. Leipzig: Gustav Fock, 1919.

James Joyce. Ulysses, chapter 7 (Aeolus). Paris: Shakespeare and Company, 1922. Reprinted, e.g., Ulysses: The Corrected Text. Edited by Hans Walter Gabler with Wolfhard Steppe and Claus Melchior, pages 116–17. New York: Random House, 1986. (The orator John F. Taylor is quoted saying: “It seemed to me that I had been transported into a country far away from this country, into an age remote from this age, that I stood in ancient Egypt and that I was listening to the speech of some highpriest of that land addressed to the youthful Moses. . . . And it seemed to me that I heard the voice of that Egyptian highpriest raised in a tone of like haughtiness and like pride. I heard his words and their meaning was revealed to me. . . . Why will you Jews not accept our culture, our religion and our language? You are a tribe of nomad herdsmen: we are a mighty people. You have no cities nor no wealth: our cities are hives of humanity and our galleys, trireme and quadrireme, laden with all manner merchandise furrow the waters of the known globe. You have but emerged from primitive conditions: we have a literature, a priesthood, an agelong history and a polity. . . . But, ladies and gentlemen, had the youthful Moses listened to and accepted that view of life, had he bowed his head and bowed his will and bowed his spirit before that arrogant admonition he would never have brought the chosen people out of their house of bondage, nor followed the pillar of the cloud by day. He would never have spoken with the Eternal amid lightnings on Sinai's mountaintop nor ever have come down with the light of inspiration shining in his countenance and bearing in his arms the tables of the law, graven in the language of the outlaw.”).
Alexander Alan Steinbach. Sabbath Queen: Fifty-four Bible Talks to the Young Based on Each Portion of the Pentateuch, pages 42–45. New York: Behrman's Jewish Book House, 1936.
Benno Jacob. The Second Book of the Bible: Exodus. London, 1940. Translated by Walter Jacob, pages 142–280. Hoboken, New Jersey: KTAV Publishing House, 1992.
Thomas Mann. Joseph and His Brothers. Translated by John E. Woods, page 788. New York: Alfred A. Knopf, 2005. Originally published as Joseph und seine Brüder. Stockholm: Bermann-Fischer Verlag, 1943.

Umberto Cassuto. A Commentary on the Book of Exodus. Jerusalem, 1951. Translated by Israel Abrahams, pages 76–122. Jerusalem: The Magnes Press, The Hebrew University, 1967.
Elie Munk. The Call of the Torah: An Anthology of Interpretation and Commentary on the Five Books of Moses. Translated by E.S. Mazer, volume 2, pages 74–111. Brooklyn: Mesorah Publications, 1995. Originally published as La Voix de la Thora. Paris: Fondation Samuel et Odette Levy, 1981.
Walther Zimmerli. "I Am Yahweh." In I Am Yahweh. Translated by Douglas W. Stott; edited and introduction by Walter Brueggemann, pages 1–28. Atlanta: John Knox Press, 1982. Originally published in Geschichte und Altes Testament, pages 179–209. J.C.B. Mohr, 1953.
Roland de Vaux. "The Revelation of the Divine Name YHVH." In Proclamation and Presence: Old Testament Essays in Honour of Gwynne Henton Davies. Edited by John I. Durham and J. Roy Porter, pages 48–75. London: SCM Press, 1970.
Ziony Zevit. “The Priestly Redaction and Interpretation of the Plague Narrative in Exodus.” The Jewish Quarterly Review, new series, volume 66, number 4 (April 1976): pages 193–211.
Marvin H. Pope. “Mid Rock and Scrub, A Ugaritic Parallel to Exodus 7:19.” In Biblical and Near Eastern Studies: Essays in Honor of William Sanford La Sor. Edited by Gary A. Tuttle, pages 146–50. Grand Rapids, Michigan: Eerdmans, 1978.
Robert R. Wilson, "The Hardening of Pharaoh's Heart." Catholic Biblical Quarterly, volume 41 (number 1) (1979): pages 18–36.
Ziony Zevit. "Three Ways to Look at the Ten Plagues: Were They Natural Disasters, A Demonstration of the Impotence of the Egyptian Gods or an Undoing of Creation?" Bible Review, volume 6 (number 3) (June 1980).
John E. Currid. "Why Did God Harden Pharaoh's Heart?" Bible Review, volume 9 (number 6) (November/December 1983).
Judith R. Baskin. Pharaoh's Counsellors: Job, Jethro, and Balaam in Rabbinic and Patristic Tradition. Brown Judaic Studies, 1983.
Pinchas H. Peli. Torah Today: A Renewed Encounter with Scripture, pages 59–62. Washington, D.C.: B'nai B'rith Books, 1987.
Mark S. Smith. The Early History of God: Yahweh and the Other Deities in Ancient Israel, pages 4, 8, 66. New York: HarperSanFrancisco, 1990.
Ziony Zevit. “Three Ways to Look at the Ten Plagues:Were they natural disasters, a demonstration of the impotence of the Egyptian gods or an undoing of Creation? Bible Review, volume 6, number 3 (1990).
Harvey J. Fields. A Torah Commentary for Our Times: Volume II: Exodus and Leviticus, pages 17–24. New York: UAHC Press, 1991.
Nahum M. Sarna. The JPS Torah Commentary: Exodus: The Traditional Hebrew Text with the New JPS Translation, pages 30–48, 269. Philadelphia: Jewish Publication Society, 1991.
Nehama Leibowitz. New Studies in Shemot (Exodus), pages 114–77. Jerusalem: Haomanim Press, 1993. Reprinted as New Studies in the Weekly Parasha. Lambda Publishers, 2010.
Aaron Wildavsky. Assimilation versus Separation: Joseph the Administrator and the Politics of Religion in Biblical Israel, page 14. New Brunswick, N.J.: Transaction Publishers, 1993.
Walter Brueggemann. “The Book of Exodus.” In The New Interpreter's Bible. Edited by Leander E. Keck, volume 1, pages 731–60. Nashville: Abingdon Press, 1994.
Judith S. Antonelli. "Elisheva." In In the Image of God: A Feminist Commentary on the Torah, pages 146–53. Northvale, New Jersey: Jason Aronson, 1995.
Ellen Frankel. The Five Books of Miriam: A Woman’s Commentary on the Torah, pages 102–04. New York: G. P. Putnam's Sons, 1996.
Marc Gellman. "The Pharaoh and the Frog." In God's Mailbox: More Stories About Stories in the Bible, pages 36–43. New York: Morrow Junior Books, 1996.
W. Gunther Plaut. The Haftarah Commentary, pages 131–39. New York: UAHC Press, 1996.
Sorel Goldberg Loeb and Barbara Binder Kadden. Teaching Torah: A Treasury of Insights and Activities, pages 94–99. Denver: A.R.E. Publishing, 1997.
William H.C. Propp. Exodus 1–18, volume 2, pages 261–354. New York: Anchor Bible, 1998.
Susan Freeman. Teaching Jewish Virtues: Sacred Sources and Arts Activities, pages 332–46. Springfield, New Jersey: A.R.E. Publishing, 1999..Exodus to Deuteronomy: A Feminist Companion to the Bible (Second Series). Edited by Athalya Brenner, pages 22, 30–31, 47, 59, 85, 95–96, 98, 100–01, 107, 164, 169. Sheffield: Sheffield Academic Press, 2000.
Avivah Gottlieb Zornberg. The Particulars of Rapture: Reflections on Exodus, pages 81–131. New York: Doubleday, 2001.
Lainie Blum Cogan and Judy Weiss. Teaching Haftarah: Background, Insights, and Strategies, pages 451–57. Denver: A.R.E. Publishing, 2002.
Michael Fishbane. The JPS Bible Commentary: Haftarot, pages 87–93. Philadelphia: Jewish Publication Society, 2002.
Bernhard Lang. "Why God Has So Many Names." Bible Review, volume 19 (number 4) (August 2003): pages 48–54, 63.

Robert Alter. The Five Books of Moses: A Translation with Commentary, pages 339–64. New York: W.W. Norton & Co., 2004.
Barack Obama. Dreams from My Father, page 294. New York: Three Rivers Press, 1995, 2004. (Moses and Pharaoh).
Jeffrey H. Tigay. "What's in a Name? Early Evidence of Devotion Exclusively to Yahweh." Bible Review, volume 20 (number 1) (February 2004): pages 34–43, 47–51.
Jeffrey H. Tigay. "Exodus." In The Jewish Study Bible. Edited by Adele Berlin and Marc Zvi Brettler, pages 115–22. New York: Oxford University Press, 2004.

Marek Halter. Zipporah, Wife of Moses, pages 245–49. New York: Crown, 2005.Professors on the Parashah: Studies on the Weekly Torah Reading Edited by Leib Moscovitz, pages 94–99. Jerusalem: Urim Publications, 2005.
Lawrence Kushner. Kabbalah: A Love Story, page 78. New York: Morgan Road Books, 2006.
W. Gunther Plaut. The Torah: A Modern Commentary: Revised Edition. Revised edition edited by David E.S. Stern, pages 379–404. New York: Union for Reform Judaism, 2006.
Suzanne A. Brody. "The highest form." In Dancing in the White Spaces: The Yearly Torah Cycle and More Poems, page 76. Shelbyville, Kentucky: Wasteland Press, 2007.

James L. Kugel. How To Read the Bible: A Guide to Scripture, Then and Now, pages 40, 54, 205, 216–32, 376, 421, 425. New York: Free Press, 2007.
Kenton L. Sparks. “‘Enūma Elish’ and Priestly Mimesis: Elite Emulation in Nascent Judaism.” Journal of Biblical Literature, volume 126 (2007): 635–37. (“Priestly Mimesis in the Exodus Story”).The Torah: A Women's Commentary. Edited by Tamara Cohn Eskenazi and Andrea L. Weiss, pages 311–54. New York: URJ Press, 2008.
Thomas B. Dozeman. Commentary on Exodus, pages 159–238. Grand Rapids, Michigan: William B. Eerdmans Publishing Company, 2009.
Reuven Hammer. Entering Torah: Prefaces to the Weekly Torah Portion, pages 83–88. New York: Gefen Publishing House, 2009.
Rebecca G.S. Idestrom. “Echoes of the Book of Exodus in Ezekiel.” Journal for the Study of the Old Testament, volume 33 (number 4) (June 2009): pages 489–510. (Motifs from Exodus found in Ezekiel, including the call narrative, divine encounters, captivity, signs, plagues, judgment, redemption, tabernacle/temple, are considered.).
Jhos Singer. “Uncircumcized Lips: Parashat Vaeira (Exodus 6:2–9:35).” In Torah Queeries: Weekly Commentaries on the Hebrew Bible. Edited by Gregg Drinkwater, Joshua Lesser, and David Shneer; foreword by Judith Plaskow, pages 80–84. New York: New York University Press, 2009.
Bruce Wells. "Exodus." In Zondervan Illustrated Bible Backgrounds Commentary. Edited by John H. Walton, volume 1, pages 181–98. Grand Rapids, Michigan: Zondervan, 2009.

Berel Dov Lerner. “Crying Out About Frogs.” Vetus Testamentum, volume 60 (number 4) (2010): pages 662–63.
Jonathan Sacks. Covenant & Conversation: A Weekly Reading of the Jewish Bible: Exodus: The Book of Redemption, pages 41–68. Jerusalem: Maggid Books, 2010.
Sam Ernst and Jim Dunn. "A Tale of Two Audreys." In Haven, season 2, episode 1. Entertainment One, 2011. (plagues plot element).

Shmuel Herzfeld. "Building a Noble Community." In Fifty-Four Pick Up: Fifteen-Minute Inspirational Torah Lessons, pages 80–85. Jerusalem: Gefen Publishing House, 2012.Torah MiEtzion: New Readings in Tanach: Shemot. Edited by Ezra Bick and Yaakov Beasley, pages 61–107. Jerusalem: Maggid Books, 2012.
Ari Kahn. “Lessons in Leadership.” The Jerusalem Report, volume 25 (number 21) (January 26, 2015): page 47.
Jonathan Sacks. Lessons in Leadership: A Weekly Reading of the Jewish Bible, pages 67–71. New Milford, Connecticut: Maggid Books, 2015.
David Fohrman. The Exodus You Almost Passed Over. Aleph Beta Press, 2016.
Jean-Pierre Isbouts. Archaeology of the Bible: The Greatest Discoveries From Genesis to the Roman Era, pages 105–07. Washington, D.C.: National Geographic, 2016.
Jonathan Sacks. Essays on Ethics: A Weekly Reading of the Jewish Bible, pages 85–89. New Milford, Connecticut: Maggid Books, 2016.
Shai Held. The Heart of Torah, Volume 1: Essays on the Weekly Torah Portion: Genesis and Exodus, pages 134–43. Philadelphia: Jewish Publication Society, 2017.
Steven Levy and Sarah Levy. The JPS Rashi Discussion Torah Commentary, pages 44–46. Philadelphia: Jewish Publication Society, 2017.
Bill Dauster. "Pharaoh’s Administration Offers a Cautionary Tale for Today." Washington Jewish Week. January 11, 2018, page 19.
Biblical Archaeology Society Staff. “Exodus in the Bible and the Egyptian Plagues: Can we make sense of the Biblical plagues?” Bible History Daily, March 31, 2020.
Andrew Tobolowsky. "The Problem of Reubenite Primacy: New Paradigms, New Answers." Journal of Biblical Literature'', volume 139, number 1 (2020): pages 27–45.

External links

Texts
Masoretic text and 1917 JPS translation
Hear the parashah chanted
Hear the parashah read in Hebrew

Commentaries

Academy for Jewish Religion, California
Academy for Jewish Religion, New York
Aish.com
Akhlah: The Jewish Children's Learning Network 
Aleph Beta Academy
American Jewish University — Ziegler School of Rabbinic Studies
Anshe Emes Synagogue, Los Angeles 
Ari Goldwag
Ascent of Safed
Bar-Ilan University 
Chabad.org
eparsha.com
G-dcast 
The Israel Koschitzky Virtual Beit Midrash
Jewish Agency for Israel
Jewish Theological Seminary
Mechon Hadar
Miriam Aflalo 
MyJewishLearning.com
Ohr Sameach
Orthodox Union
OzTorah, Torah from Australia
Oz Ve Shalom — Netivot Shalom
Pardes from Jerusalem
Professor James L. Kugel
Professor Michael Carasik
Rabbi Dov Linzer
Rabbi Fabian Werbin
Rabbi Jonathan Sacks
RabbiShimon.com
Rabbi Shlomo Riskin
Rabbi Shmuel Herzfeld
Rabbi Stan Levin
Reconstructionist Judaism 
Sephardic Institute
Shiur.com
613.org Jewish Torah Audio 
Tanach Study Center
Teach613.org, Torah Education at Cherry Hill
TheTorah.com
Torah from Dixie
Torah.org
TorahVort.com
Union for Reform Judaism
United Synagogue of Conservative Judaism 
What's Bothering Rashi?
Yeshivat Chovevei Torah
Yeshiva University

Weekly Torah readings in Tevet
Weekly Torah readings from Exodus